Jabal Khalaqah  (جبل خلقه)   is a mountain of the Sarwat Mountains and one of the highest mountains of Saudi Arabia.

It is  located at 18°46′57″N 42°13′41″E in Bllsamar, 'Asir Region . And at a height of 2,850 m (9,350 ft) it is the eighth tallest peek in Saudi Arabia.

Jabal Khalaqah means Mount Creation or His Creation in Arabic.

References

Khalaqah